Oorlams (also: Oorlands, Oorlans) is a dialect of Afrikaans spoken in the Republic of South Africa and Namibia, by the Oorlam people. 

It is considered to be either an Afrikaans-based creole language or a dialect of Afrikaans proper. 

Oorlams has many elements from Khoi languages.

See also
Historical dialects of Afrikaans

References

Languages of South Africa
Oorlam people